The 2013 Mexico train accident occurred on August 25, 2013 after the freight train "La Bestia", with 300 passengers on board, was derailed in Huimanguillo, Tabasco. The accident killed 6 people and another 22 were injured, 16 of them were in grave condition.

References

Railway accidents in 2013
2013 in Mexico
Derailments in Mexico
History of Tabasco
August 2013 events in Mexico